Sara Sugarman (born 13 October 1962) is a Welsh actress and filmmaker whose work includes Disney's Confessions of a Teenage Drama Queen (2004) and Very Annie Mary (2001). She has also appeared in films including Dealers (1989) and Those Glory Glory Days (1983).

Biography
Sugarman was born in Rhyl, Denbighshire, Wales, into a Jewish family. As a young teenager, she played in a punk outfit called The Fractures, managed by local musician Mike Peters. During this period, she played the rebellious SAG (School Action Group) leader Jessica Samuels in the children's drama TV series Grange Hill (1978–1979).

In London, Sugarman attended both the Arts Educational School  and then Barbara Speake Stage School in Acton. She attended the Royal Academy of Dramatic Art (RADA) from 1986 to 1989, where she won the Best Actress medal. In 1992, she married the actor David Thewlis. They divorced in 1994.

In 1994 she won a place at Bournemouth Film School and scripted and directed three short films, nominated for a BAFTA, BAFTA CYMRU and won twenty three International film festivals. She won International Film maker's prize at the Sundance Film Festival and HBO film maker prize at HBO comedy festival and the Orange Prize for screenwriting.

As of 2010, Sugarman was living in Los Angeles. In 2012, Sugarman wrote and directed Vinyl, a British comedy film based on the true story of Welsh musician Mike Peters of The Alarm who in 2004 released the single "45 RPM" under the name of a fictitious band "The Poppy Fields". Much of the film was shot on location in Sugarman's hometown Rhyl.

Selected work

Filmmaker
Midas Man (2022; director, replaced Jonas Åkerlund)
Save the Cinema (2022; director)
 House of Versace (2013, director)
Vinyl (2012; writer, director)
Confessions of a Teenage Drama Queen (2004; director)
Very Annie Mary (2001; writer, director)
Mad Cows (1999; director)

Film appearances
Mr. Nice (2010)
Anthrakitis (1998) (short film)
Dealers (1989)
Straight to Hell (1987)
Escape from Sobibor (1987) (TV)
Sid and Nancy (1986)
Those Glory Glory Days (1983)

Television appearances
A Very Peculiar Practice (1986)
Happy Families (1985)
Minder  (1984)
Juliet Bravo (1980)
Grange Hill (1978–1979) as Jessica Samuels

References

External links

1962 births
Living people
Welsh film actresses
Welsh women film directors
People from Rhyl
Welsh television actresses
20th-century Welsh actresses
21st-century Welsh actresses
Alumni of RADA
British expatriate actresses in the United States
Welsh Jews
Alumni of Arts University Bournemouth